"Orange Blossom Special" is a fiddle tune about a luxury passenger train of the same name. The song was written by Ervin T. Rouse (1917–1981) in 1938 and was first recorded by Rouse and his brother Gordon in 1939. Often called simply "The Special" or "OBS", the song is commonly referred to as "the fiddle player's national anthem".

Importance
By the 1950s, "The Orange Blossom Special" had become a perennial favorite at bluegrass festivals, popular for its rousing energy.

Authorship
Rouse copyrighted the song before the Orange Blossom Special train ever came to Jacksonville. Other musicians, including Robert Russell "Chubby" Wise, have claimed authorship of the song.  Wise did not write it although he claimed for years that he had. Rouse, a mild mannered man who lived deep in the Everglades never contested the matter.  Years later, Johnny Cash learned of Rouse and brought him to Miami to play the song at one of his concerts. In a video on YouTube, Gene Christian, a fiddler for Bill Monroe who knew both men, confirms that Rouse wrote and copyrighted the song. Christian says in the interview that Chubby Wise popularized the song by playing it weekly on the Grand Ole Opry.

As Wise tells the story, he and Rouse decided to visit the Jacksonville Terminal in Florida to tour the Orange Blossom Special train.

Rouse copyrighted the song in 1938 and recorded it in 1939. Bill Monroe, regarded by many as "the father of bluegrass music", recorded the song (with Art Wooten on fiddle) and made it a hit. Since then countless versions have been recorded, among them Wise's own, as an instrumental in a 1969 album Chubby Wise and His Fiddle. And that version, said Wise, "is the way it was written and the way it's supposed to be played".

Leon "Pappy" Selph says that he was the author of The Orange Blossom Special in this interview in 1997.  He states that he wrote it in 1931.

Lyrics

The lyrics of the song are in the 12-bar blues form but the full piece is more elaborate.

Look a-yonder comin'
Comin' down that railroad track
Hey, look a-yonder comin'
Comin' down that railroad track
It's the Orange Blossom Special
Bringin' my baby back

Well, I'm going down to Florida
And get some sand in my shoes
Or maybe Californy
And get some sand in my shoes
I'll ride that Orange Blossom Special
And lose these New York blues

"Say man, when you going back to Florida?"
"When am I goin' back to Florida? I don't know, don't reckon I ever will."
"Ain't you worried about getting your nourishment in New York?"
"Well, I don't care if I do-die-do-die-do-die-do-die."

Hey talk about a-ramblin'
She's the fastest train on the line
Talk about a-travellin'
She's the fastest train on the line
It's that Orange Blossom Special
Rollin' down the seaboard line

The lyrics of the first verse are very reminiscent of the Jimmie Rodgers song "Freight Whistle Blues".

Notable versions
 In 1961, Swedish group The Spotnicks released an instrumental, reverb guitar version of the bluegrass classic that hit big in Australia, UK and other European countries.
In 1966, Chet Atkins recorded for his version along with the Boston Pops Orchestra with Arthur Fiedler as conductor for The 'Pops' Goes Country album.
Johnny Cash named his 1965 Orange Blossom Special album after the song. While bluegrass performers tend to play it as strictly an instrumental, Cash sang the lyrics, and replaced the fiddle parts with two harmonicas and a saxophone. Cash would play both harmonicas himself, as heard on At Folsom Prison and seen on The Johnny Cash Show. In live performance, prior to the "do-die-do-die-do" transition, Cash tended to insert some spoken-word jokes that changed in later performances of the song (in his Tennessee State Prison and Prague performances, he incorporated dialogue from his 1972 song "City Jail").
Vassar Clements with the Nitty Gritty Dirt Band on their Will the Circle be Unbroken album.
The americana/bluegrass/rock fusion band Seatrain recorded and released it in 1970. This version features Richard Green (formerly with Bill Monroe; Monroe stated: "nobody plays "Orange Blossom Special" like Richard) on fiddle and  Peter Rowan on vocals. Dave Swarbrick (best known from Fairport Convention) recorded and released a very similar version a few years later.
The Moody Brothers' Grammy-nominated country instrumental "The Great Train Song Medley" featured their father Dwight Moody playing fiddle on "Orange Blossom Special".
A version by Doug Kershaw peaked at #9 on the RPM Country Tracks chart in Canada in 1970.
Charlie McCoy recorded a harmonica-led cover of the song that peaked at #26 on the Billboard Hot Country Songs chart in 1973.
 The song was covered by Swedish instrumental rock band The Spotnicks in 1961 and released on their first album, The Spotnicks in London – Out-a-Space!. In 1962 the Spotnicks recording entered the British Top 30.
Charlie Daniels's 1974 Platinum album Fire On The Mountain contains an instrumental live performance recorded at the War Memorial Auditorium in Nashville, Tennessee on October 4, 1974.
Electric Light Orchestra also covered the song in their early shows. One of these performances was released on their 1974 live album The Night the Light Went On in Long Beach, following a violin improvisation by Mik Kaminski.
Billy Vaughn and his orchestra covered the song with an instrumental version in 1961, a highly regarded take.
James Last first released a cover on the 1977 album called Western Party. It became so popular it was played at every live concert until Last's death in 2015.

See also
Orange Blossom Special (train)
List of train songs

References

Further reading

Video

Silver Star Leaves Miami: The Orange Blossom Special performed by Ted the Fiddler, from the Hy Mayerson and Sean Corcoran travelogue Miami to New York

External links
 Recording of the "Orange Blossom Special" by Gamble Rogers at the 1982 Florida Folk Festival; made available for public use by the State Archives of Florida.

1938 songs
American folk songs
Bluegrass songs
Bill Monroe songs
Charlie McCoy songs
Chet Atkins songs
Doug Kershaw songs
Johnny Cash songs
Johnny Darrell songs
Songs about trains
Columbia Records singles